John Thomas "Jack, Red" Keating (October 9, 1916 — December 19, 1951) was a Canadian ice hockey player who played 12 games in the National Hockey League with the Detroit Red Wings during the 1938–39 and 1939–40 seasons. The rest of his career, which lasted from 1936 to 1948, was spent in the minor leagues, as well as two seasons in the English National League. Keating was born in Kitchener, Ontario. From 1943 to 1945 he served in the military during the Second World War. While playing for the Harringay Racers in 1937–38, he was the top goal scorer in the UK with 29 goals. In 1946, he married Blanche Kernel in Indianapolis and had 3 children. He graduated from Optometry school in 1951 and died in Indianapolis that year of cancer.

Career statistics

Regular season and playoffs

External links
 

1916 births
1951 deaths
Canadian ice hockey left wingers
Detroit Red Wings players
Harringay Racers players
Hollywood Wolves players
Ice hockey people from Ontario
Indianapolis Capitals players
Kitchener Greenshirts players
Los Angeles Monarchs players
Pittsburgh Hornets players
Richmond Hawks players
Sportspeople from Kitchener, Ontario